The 1. FC Katowice is a Polish football club from Katowice, Silesian Voivodeship and was founded in 2007 as a reactivation by the Silesian Autonomy Movement of the 1945 dissolved 1. FC Kattowitz.

Men's football team 
The club was reactivated in 2007, and spent most of his time in the klasa B (eighth league level).

Women's football team 
The women's section started in the 3rd tier, but has managed two promotions and won the promotion to the Ekstraliga Kobiet in 2010–11. As a result of the expansion of the Ekstraliga in 2010–11, a third-place finish in the 2nd division 2009-10 was enough to reach the promotion playoffs, which were won. The women's section played in the top level Ekstraliga Kobiet in 2010–11, 2011–12 and 2014–15. Before the 2015–16 season, the team withdrew from the second level league. 

In 2015 the women's section was disbanded citing financial problems. There were plans to transfer the team to GKS Katowice, but eventually GKS re-founded their own women's section.

References

External links 
 1. FC Katowice (men's football team)'s 90minut.pl profile
 1. FC Katowice (women's football team)'s 90minut.pl profile

Football clubs in Katowice
Women's football clubs in Poland
Association football clubs established in 2007
2007 establishments in Poland
Organisations based in Katowice
Sport in Katowice